Si That is a district (amphoe) in the southeastern Udon Thani province, northeastern Thailand.

Geography
Neighboring districts are (from the west clockwise) Kumphawapi, Ku Kaeo, Chai Wan and Wang Sam Mo of Udon Thani Province, and Tha Khantho of Kalasin province.

History
The minor district (king amphoe) Si That was created on 1 March 1968 by splitting off the five tambons Champi, Na Yung, Nong Ya Sai, Ban Prong, and Nong Kung Thap Ma from Kumphawapi district. It was upgraded to a full district on 28 June 1973.

Administration
The district is divided into seven sub-districts (tambons), which are further subdivided into 81 villages (mubans). Si That is a township (thesaban tambon) which covers parts of tambon Si That. There are a further seven tambon administrative organizations (TAO).

References

External links
amphoe.com

Si That